Yuge may refer to:

Surname:
Tomohisa Yuge (born 1980), Japanese actor
Prince Yuge (died 699), Japanese prince

Given name:
Zhang Yuge (born 1996), Chinese singer

Other:
Yuge, Ehime, town in Ehime Prefecture, Japan
Yuge Station, Okayama Prefecture, Japan
Yuge! 30 Years of Doonesbury on Trump, an anthology of Doonesbury cartoons (2016)